John Richard Urry  (1 June 1946, London – 18 March 2016, Lancaster) was a British sociologist who served as a professor at Lancaster University. He is noted for work in the fields of the sociology of tourism and mobility.

He wrote books on many other aspects of modern society including the transition away from "organised capitalism", the sociology of nature and environmentalism, and social theory in general.

Background
Born in London and educated at the Haberdashers' Aske's Boys' School, Urry gained his first degrees from Christ's College, Cambridge in 1967, a 'double first' BA and MA in Economics, before going on to gain his PhD in Sociology from the same institution in 1972. He arrived at Lancaster University Sociology department as a lecturer in 1970, becoming head of department in 1983 and a professor in 1985.

Urry was a Fellow of the Royal Society of Arts, a Founding Academician of the UK Academy of Learned Societies for the Social Sciences, and was a Visiting Professor at both Bristol and Roskilde Geography Departments.

His partner was the sociologist Sylvia Walby.

Research interests

His original research interests were in the sociology of power and revolution and this resulted in the publication of Reference Groups and the Theory of Revolution (1973) and Power in Britain (1973).

Early work at Lancaster was in the area of social theory and the philosophy of the social sciences. Social Theory as Science, (1975, 1982), co-written with his colleague Russell Keat, set out the main features of the realist philosophy of science. Critical confrontation with a number of Marxist traditions, of Althusserian structuralism, German state theory, and neo-Gramscian theory, resulted in the Anatomy of Capitalist Societies (1981).

Research Areas
Research until his death focused on five main areas.

Regionalism
First, there was the urban and regional research mainly associated with the Lancaster Regionalism Group. Collaborative research resulted in Localities, Class and Gender (1985) and Restructuring. Place, Class and Gender (1990) Two particular themes were pursued: the relationship between society and space (as in the Social Relations and Spatial Structures, co-edited with Derek Gregory, 1985); and the possibilities of developing local economic policies (as in Place, Policy and Politics, 1990).

Economic and social change
The second area of research was the more general dimensions of economic and social change in western capitalist societies. This resulted in three jointly written books, Capital, Labour and the Middle Classes (1983); The End of Organized Capitalism (1987); and Economies of Signs and Space (1994; latter two with Scott Lash).

Consumer and tourism services
Thirdly, research focused upon one particular set of industries that are of particular significance in contemporary western societies, namely consumer services and especially tourist-related services. The economic, social, environmental and cultural implications of such developments can be seen in The Tourist Gaze (1990, 2002: 2nd edn.), Consuming Places (1995), Touring Cultures (1997, edited with Chris Rojek), Tourism Mobilities (2004, edited with Mimi Sheller), and Performing Tourist Places (with J-O Barenholdt, M Haldrup, J. Larsen). This concern was extended to issues of environmental change and the 'sociology of nature' see Contested Natures (1998), Bodies of Nature (2001) (both with Phil Macnaghten) and Climate Change and Society (2011).

Mobility
Fourthly, Urry had various research projects and publications relating to the changing nature of mobility. Publications include: Sociology Beyond Societies (2000), a special issue of Theory, Culture and Society, (August 2004 on Automobilities coedited with Mike Feathersone, Nigel Thrift); Mobile Technologies of the city (2006); coedited with Mimi Sheller. John Urry also directed the Centre for Mobilities Research between 2003 and 2015 and was later the co-director of the Institute for Social Futures.

Complexity theory
Finally, John Urry had been exploring some implications of complexity theory for the social sciences. Publications here include Global Complexity (2003), and "Complexity", a special double issue of Theory, Culture & Society (2005).

He was also one of the founding editors of the new journal Mobilities, and served as editor of the International Library of Sociology since 1990 (Routledge).

Books published

(excluding foreign language editions; books translated into 10+ languages)

1973
Reference Groups and the Theory of Revolution, Routledge and Kegan Paul
Power in Britain, Heinemann Education (co edited with John Wakeford)
1975 Social Theory as Science, Routledge and Kegan Paul (with Russell Keat)
1981 The Anatomy of Capitalist Societies, Macmillan
1982 Social Theory as Science, Second Edition, Routledge and Kegan Paul (with Russell Keat)
1983 Capital, Labour and the Middle Classes, Allen and Unwin (with Nick Abercrombie)
1985
Social Relations and Spatial Structures, Macmillan (co edited with Derek Gregory)
Localities, Class, and Gender, Pion (with Lancaster Regionalism Group)
1987 The End of Organized Capitalism, Polity (with Scott Lash)
1988 Contemporary British Society, Polity (with Nick Abercrombie, Alan Warde, Keith Soothill, Sylvia Walby).
1989–96 Schools of Thought in Sociology, General Editor of 18 vols, Edward Elgar.
1990
Localities, Policies, Politics. Do Localities Matter?, Hutchinson (co edited with Michael Harloe, Chris Pickvance).
Restructuring.  Place, Class and Gender, Sage (with other members of the Lancaster Regionalism Group).
 The Tourist Gaze, Sage.
1994
Economies of Signs and Space, Sage (with Scott Lash)
Contemporary British Society, Second Edition, Polity (with Nick Abercrombie, Alan Warde, Keith Soothill, Sylvia Walby)
Leisure Landscapes, Main Report and Background Papers, CPRE (with Gordon Clark, Jan Darrall, Robin Grove-White, Phil Macnaghten)
1995 Consuming Places, Routledge
1997  Touring Cultures, Routledge (co edited with Chris Rojek)
1998  Contested Natures, Sage (with Phil Macnaghten)
2000
"Sociology for the New Millennium." Special issue of the British Journal of Sociology (commissioned: contributors include Castells, Wallerstein, Beck, Sassen, Therborn)
 Sociology beyond Societies, Routledge
 Contemporary British Society, Third Edition, Polity (with Nick Abercrombie, Alan Warde et al.)
 "Bodies of Nature". Special issue of Body and Society 6 (commissioned: co edited with Phil Macnaghten)
2001 Bodies of Nature. Sage (co edited with Phil Macnaghten)
2002 The Tourist Gaze. Second Edition, London: Sage
2003 Global Complexity, Cambridge: Polity
2004
"Presence-Absence." Special issue of Environment and Planning A: Society and Space 22 (co edited with Michel Callon and John Law)
"Automobilities." Special issue of Theory, Culture and Society 21 (co edited with Mike Featherstone and Nigel Thrift)
 Tourism Mobilities. Places to Play, Places in Play, Routledge (co edited with Mimi Sheller)
Performing Tourist Places, Ashgate (with Bærenholdt, J. O., Haldrup, M., Larsen, J.)
2005
"Complexity." Special Issue of Theory, Culture and Society 22 1- 270
Automobilities. London: Sage (co edited with Featherstone, M., Thrift, N.) 285 pp.
Sociologie de Mobilités: Une nouvelle frontiére pour la sociologie?,  Paris, Armand Colin, 251pp.
2006
"Mobilities and Materialities." Special issue of Environment and Planning A (co-edited with M. Sheller)
Mobile Technologies of the City, London: Routledge (coedited with M. Sheller)
Mobilities, Geographies, Networks, London: Ashgate (with J. Larsen, K.Axhausen)
 2007 Mobilities, Cambridge: Polity
 2010 Mobile Lives, London: Routledge (with Anthony Elliott)
 2011 Climate Change and Society, Cambridge: Polity
 2013 Societies Beyond Oil, London: Zed
 2014 Offshoring, Cambridge: Polity
 2016 What is the Future?, Cambridge: Polity

References

 Lancaster University Staff pages
 Curriculum Vitae
 Publishers

External links 

Lectures
 Lecture (video/audio): Mobility Futures
 Lecture (video/audio): Mobility Futures at World-Information City conference in Paris 2009
 Interview (video/audio): Mobilities and Societies Beyond Oil

People educated at Haberdashers' Boys' School
British sociologists
Environmental sociologists
Fellows of the Academy of Social Sciences
Alumni of Christ's College, Cambridge
Academics of Lancaster University
1946 births
2016 deaths
Writers about globalization
Academics from London